Mario Čuić (born 22 April 2001)  is a Croatian professional footballer who plays as a midfielder for NK Radomlje in the Slovenian PrvaLiga on loan from Hajduk Split.

Club career 
Mario Čuić was born in Split, but raised in Brišnik, a village in the municipality of Tomislavgrad, Bosnia and Herzegovina. He started his football career at local club Tomislav. He moved to neighbouring Croatia, joining the youth academy of famed Dalmatian club Hajduk Split in 2015. In late 2019, he signed a five-year contract with Hajduk.

Čuić made his debut for Hajduk on 11 June 2020, earning a place in the starting eleven and playing 66 minutes in a 1–0 win over Istra 1961. Aged 19, Čuić scored his first and second Hajduk goals in the Eternal derby in a 3–2 win over Dinamo Zagreb at Stadion Maksimir. The goals came in his sixth ever professional appearance.

References 

2001 births
Living people
People from Tomislavgrad
Croats of Bosnia and Herzegovina
Association football midfielders
Croatian footballers
Croatia youth international footballers
HNK Hajduk Split players
NK Radomlje players
Croatian Football League players
Slovenian PrvaLiga players
Croatian expatriate footballers
Expatriate footballers in Slovenia
Croatian expatriate sportspeople in Slovenia